James William Beauchamp Blackett (born 17 October 1964) is a British politician, writer, landowner farmer and political activist, with articles appearing in The Daily Telegraph, The Spectator and other publications. He writes a monthly column, "Farming Life", for Country Life. He is also a regular commentator on GB News.

Early life and career 
Educated at Eton College, Blackett later served in the Coldstream Guards from 1983 to 2002, including service in The Troubles and the first Gulf War. In addition, he served as a Deputy Lieutenant for Dumfriesshire from 2013 to 2020. Blackett has been a member of the Royal Company of Archers since 2012.

Blackett is a direct descendant of Christopher Blackett of Wylam Hall, Northumberland, founder of The Globe newspaper, and entrepreneur behind the world’s oldest surviving steam engine Puffing Billy.

Literary career 
Although he writes mainly about rural matters, Blackett's first book The Enigma of Kidson (Quiller 2017), is a partly autobiographical portrait of teacher Michael Kidson, whose pupils at Eton College included former Prime Minister David Cameron. In the book, Blackett describes being beaten by the Head, Michael McCrum, one of the last acts of corporal punishment at the school. It is currently being adapted for the stage by playwright Henry Filloux-Bennett.

His latest books, Red Rag to a Bull, Rural Life in an Urban Age and the sequel, Land of Milk and Honey, Digressions of a Rural Dissident tell how he arrived home from the Army to take over Arbigland, an agricultural estate on the Solway Firth in Dumfries and Galloway to find a rapidly changing countryside. Set over 20 years through the Scottish independence referendum, hunting ban, Brexit, Coronavirus and the 2021 Scottish Parliamentary Elections the books cover challenges threatening a way of life and an emerging rural philosophy in which farmers have greater freedom to manage the countryside.

Political Career 
In 2020, Blackett became the Deputy Leader of the Alliance for Unity, a party which was founded by George Galloway to contest the 2021 Scottish Parliament election.  The registered name of the party became All for Unity, with Blackett as the Leader and Galloway as the Nominating Officer. In the election, Galloway stood as the lead candidate, with Blackett as second, in the South Scotland electoral region. Blackett argued that the ‘neverendum’ he saw destroying Scottish civic society should be ended by Westminster passing a Canada style Clarity Act. He and Galloway spoke out against what they saw as the ‘Ulsterisation’ of Scotland, Blackett linking it to his first-hand experience as a soldier in Northern Ireland. And he advocated the South of Scotland breaking away from the rest of Scotland in the event of separation and becoming a devolved nation within the United Kingdom, possibly with other pro-union regions: Edinburgh, Orkney, Shetland and North East Scotland. Blackett later broke with Galloway and All for Unity was de-registered as a political party.

References

British male writers
Living people
1964 births
21st-century British writers
People educated at Eton College
Graduates of the Royal Military Academy Sandhurst